The Soviet Union's 1976 nuclear test series was a group of 21 nuclear tests conducted in 1976. These tests  followed the 1975 Soviet nuclear tests series and preceded the 1977 Soviet nuclear tests series.

References

1976
1976 in the Soviet Union
1976 in military history
Explosions in 1976